The Hungarian Catholic Lexicon is a large-scale lexicon series in Hungarian, dealing mainly with religious topics.

History and content 
Regarding the history of the Lexicon, the editors note the following in the preface to the first volume:

The editors intended to emphasize topics related to the Hungarian church in particular. Under the editorship of István Diós and János Viczián, the Hungarian Lexicon was thus prepared independently of the Lexikon für Theologie and Kirche, and includes a range of items relating to local history, ethnography, botany, and music history.

The Lexicon, which was published in 15 volumes between 1993 and 2010 and comprises around 15,000 printed pages, was carried out under the auspices of the Szent István Társulat (St. Stephen Society), which has traditionally published ecclesiastical literature. The two-column text is decorated with many black and white and some color photographs and illustrations. In 2013, an additional volume (A–Zs) was published as the 16th, and then in 2014 the series was closed by an index volume (volume 17).

The most important of the topics covered by the encyclopedia are the followingː

 biographies (popes, kings, bishops, writers, other personalities)
 events (Hungarian ecclesiastical and secular history, universal church history)
 places (countries, dioceses, Hungarian dioceses, parishes, pilgrimage sites, monastic houses)
 institutions (monastic orders, associations)
 concepts (philosophy, scripture, dogmatics, ecclesiastical law, liturgy, arts, natural sciences)

In addition to the printed edition, the Hungarian Catholic Lexicon has also been available in electronic form. András Rácz, a student of the Faculty of Information Technology of the Pázmány Péter Catholic University, took part in the creation of the Internet version, under the supervision of Miklós Pásztor.

Order of volumes

Sources

External links 
 Digitized edition

Hungarian encyclopedias
Christian encyclopedias
20th-century encyclopedias
21st-century encyclopedias